Elaine Symons (born 4 December 1974) is an Irish actress who was trained at the Royal Academy of Dramatic Art (RADA) and who has had roles on television since 1995. She is known for her role as alcoholic mother-of-five Rose Kelly in the BBC One school TV drama Waterloo Road, making her first appearance in the first episode of the show's fourth series, screened on 7 January 2009. Her earlier credits include roles in "Sinners" Totally Frank, Waking the Dead, As If, Custer's Last Stand-up and Touched by an Angel. In 2011, Symons played the role of Kerry Cadogan in the BBC One medical TV drama Holby City.

Filmography

Theatre credits
Symons portrayed Lyra Belacqua in the November 2004 revival of His Dark Materials at the Olivier, National Theatre. She has also appeared in Duck (Royal Court), The Seagull (Bristol Old Vic), Lovers (Young Vic), A Month in the Country (Abbey Theatre - nomination for Irish Times Award), and Richard III (Trinity, Dublin).

External links 

Irish television actresses
1974 births
Living people
Irish stage actresses
Alumni of RADA